Insomnia Cookies is a chain of bakeries in the United States that specializes in delivering warm cookies, baked goods, and ice cream. Based in New York and Philadelphia, it was started in 2003 by Jared Barnett and Seth Berkowitz, both students at the University of Pennsylvania. The company has more than 200 stores, located throughout the continental U.S. Many stores are located in close proximity to university campuses and cater to students who want to order cookies late at night.

History and operations 

The Company was co-founded by Jared Barnett and Seth Berkowitz in 2003 while attending the University of Pennsylvania in Philadelphia.  Berkowitz began baking and delivering cookies from a dorm room to students on campus late at night. From there the concept of cookie delivery grew. The first retail store opened in 2004 in Syracuse, New York.

Insomnia Cookies is based in New York City and Philadelphia. Insomnia Cookies bakeries are typically located near college and university campuses to target students who wish to order cookies past the closing time of traditional bakeries. Most stores are open from 10:00a.m. until 3:00a.m. Monday-Friday, and from noon until 3:00a.m. on weekends.

The company has expanded throughout the continental U.S., opening its 100th store in 2016.

In 2018 Krispy Kreme, financed by JAB Holding Company, acquired Insomnia which continues to operate independently.

The company launched the "CookieMagic" membership service in March 2021. A subscription costs $9.99 per month and provides members with a free classic cookie every day, free local delivery from Insomnia Cookies locations, and other perks.

In April 2021, the company opened its first store with an experimental CookieLab section, a "cookie speakeasy" that offers customizable cookies and a bar with milk and milkshake options.

In June 2021, the company opened its 200th store in Exton, Pennsylvania.

Products 

Insomnia Cookies sells 17 types of classic cookies, including vegan options, and a variety of deluxe cookies. Other products include cookie cakes, brownies, milk, ice cream, and ice cream sandwiches.

References

External links 
 Insomnia Cookies website

Fast-food chains of the United States
Companies based in New York City
Food and drink companies established in 2003
2003 establishments in Pennsylvania